Peter und Paul is a German television series.

See also
List of German television series

External links
 

1994 German television series debuts
1998 German television series endings
Television shows set in Bavaria
German-language television shows
RTL (German TV channel) original programming
Fictional characters from Altbayern